An anaconda is a large, non-venomous snake found in tropical South America.

Anaconda may also refer to:

Art and entertainment

Music
 "Anaconda" (song), a 2014 song by Nicki Minaj
 "Anaconda" (The Sisters of Mercy song), 1983
 "Anaconda" (Luísa Sonza and Mariah Angeliq song), 2021
 "Anaconda", a song by the Melvins from the album Bullhead, 1991
 "Anaconda", a song by Uri Caine from the album Solitaire, 2001
 "Anaconda", a song by Drop the Lime and Untold from the album FabricLive.53, 2010

Other uses in art and entertainment
 Anaconda (film), a 1997 American horror movie
 Anaconda (film series)
 Anaconda (character), a supervillain in the Marvel Comics universe
 Anaconda (poker), a variant of the card game poker
 Anaconda (TV series), a planned prequel series to The 100

Military
 Anaconda Plan, an outline strategy for subduing the South in the American Civil War
 Operation Anaconda, a military operation in Afghanistan in early March 2002
 Logistics Support Area Anaconda, a large US military base in Iraq
 HMS Anaconda (1813), a Royal Navy brig-sloop
 HMAS Anaconda, a Royal Australian Navy auxiliary vessel during the Second World War
 Lavochkin La-250, a Soviet 1950s high-altitude interceptor aircraft prototype nicknamed "Anakonda"

Mining
 Anaconda Copper, a defunct mining company which operated two American copper mines
 Anaconda Copper Mine (Montana)
 Anaconda Copper Mine (Nevada)

Places
 Anaconda, British Columbia, a ghost town in Canada
 Anaconda, Missouri, an unincorporated community in the US
 Anaconda, Montana, a small community in the US
 Anaconda, New Mexico, a mining community in the US
 Anaconda Range, a mountain range in Montana

Software
 Anaconda (installer), an installer program for the Red Hat Linux and Fedora operating systems
 Anaconda (Python distribution)

Other uses
 Anaconda (retailer), a chain of Australian outdoor clothing and goods stores
 Colt Anaconda, a .44 Magnum revolver
 Anaconda (Kings Dominion), a roller coaster at Kings Dominion theme park
 Xbox Series X console (codename "Anaconda")
 Anaconda (Walygator Parc), a roller coaster